Michel de Klerk (24 November 1884, Amsterdam – 24 November 1923, Amsterdam) was a Dutch architect. Born to a Jewish family, he was one of the founding architects of the movement Amsterdam School (Expressionist architecture)

Early in his career he worked for other architects, including Eduard Cuypers. For a while, he also employed the Indonesian-born Liem Bwan Tjie, who would later become his country's pioneering proponent of the Amsterdam School and modern architecture. 

Of his many outstanding designs, very few have actually been built. One of his finest completed buildings is 'Het Schip' (The Ship) in the Amsterdam district of Spaarndammerbuurt.

Amsterdam West
Eigen Haard (Own Hearth), working-class Socialist housing, consisting of three groups of buildings:
(1) Spaarndammerplantsoen, North side (1913–1915)
(2) Spaarndammerplantsoen, South side (1915–1916)
(3) 'Het Schip', Zaanstraat / Oostzaanstraat / Hembrugstraat (1917–1920)

Amsterdam South
De Dageraad (The Dawn), working-class Socialist housing by Michel de Klerk and Piet Kramer (1920–1923). The architectural contribution by Michel de Klerk is shown in this article. See also Piet Kramer.

Wendingen
Buildings, projects and drawings by Michel de Klerk are published in the architecture and art magazine Wendingen (1918–1932). Three covers of this magazine are designed by de Klerk.

References

Bibliography
Suzanne S. Frank, Michel de Klerk 1884-1923 - An Architect of the Amsterdam School, UMI Research Press, Ann Arbor Mich. 1984
Manfred Bock, Sigrid Johanisse & Vladimir Stissi, Michel de Klerk 1884-1923 - Architect and Artist of the Amsterdam School, NAI Publishers, Rotterdam 1997
Wim de Wit, The Amsterdam School - Dutch Expressionist Architecture 1915-1930, Rotterdam 1983
Maristella Casciato, The Amsterdam School, Rotterdam 1996
Joseph Buch, A Century of Architecture in The Netherlands, NAI Publishers, Rotterdam 1995

1884 births
1923 deaths
Brick Expressionism
Dutch architects
Dutch Jews
Architects from Amsterdam